Zafarobod District may refer to:
 Zafarobod District, Tajikistan in Sughd Region of Tajikistan
 Zafarobod District, Uzbekistan in Jizzakh Region of Uzbekistan